Zac Nearchou (born Reading,  16 November 2000) is an English rugby union player.
His usual position is as a Prop and he currently plays for Premiership Rugby team Wasps.

In 2020-21 season, he played, on loan, with Italian Pro14 team Benetton.

He was educated at Radley College, Oxford.

Nearchou can also operate at hooker and has represented England at Under 18s and Under 19s levels.

References 

It's Rugby England Profile
Ultimate Rugby Profile

2000 births
Living people
Ampthill RUFC players
Benetton Rugby players
English rugby union players
Rugby union players from Reading, Berkshire
Rugby union props